James Joseph ("Jimmy") Tayoun (March 27, 1930 – November 1, 2017) was a Democratic member of Philadelphia City Council and of the Pennsylvania House of Representatives.

He served non-consecutive terms representing District 1 on Philadelphia City Council. He resigned from his first term in 1984 to run for a seat in the First Congressional District of Pennsylvania, challenging incumbent Thomas Foglietta.

He resigned from his second term after pleading guilty to racketeering, mail fraud, tax evasion and obstruction of justice charges.  He spent 40 months in prison.  He is the 7th council member to be indicted since 1972.

He was also editor, publisher, and photographer for the Public Record, a weekly newspaper.

References

External links
 Philadelphia Public Record website 

1930 births
2017 deaths
Philadelphia City Council members
Democratic Party members of the Pennsylvania House of Representatives
American people convicted of tax crimes
People convicted of obstruction of justice
Politicians convicted of mail and wire fraud
Politicians convicted of racketeering
Pennsylvania politicians convicted of crimes
Temple University alumni
Editors of Pennsylvania newspapers